Irina Stephanie von Wiese und Kaiserswaldau (born 11 September 1967) is a British politician, who was a Liberal Democrat Member of the European Parliament (MEP) for London between 2019 and the United Kingdom's withdrawal from the EU.

Career 
In a by-election in 2017, she stood unsuccessfully for election to Hammersmith & Fulham council, coming third.

She was elected a Member of the European Parliament for the London region in the 2019 European Parliament election, on the Liberal Democrat party list, assuming office on 2 July 2019. She sat within the Renew Europe group of liberal political parties and served as Vice-Chair on the European Parliament's Subcommittee on Human Rights (DROI).

Until at least August 2019, she was formerly the Liberal Democrat prospective parliamentary candidate for Hammersmith in the 2019 United Kingdom general election. She was a candidate for the 2021 London Assembly election.

Personal life
Wiese holds both German and British citizenship. She earned a Master of Public Administration (MPA) degree from Harvard University. She has one teenage daughter and has housed refugees in her London home since 2016, working with the charity Refugees at Home.

References

External links 

 European Parliament Page
 Irina Von Wiese on Twitter
 Irina Von Wiese/ on Facebook

1967 births
Living people
21st-century German women politicians
German emigrants to the United Kingdom
Harvard Kennedy School alumni
Liberal Democrats (UK) MEPs
21st-century women MEPs for England
MEPs for England 2019–2020
Politicians from Cologne
People from Hammersmith
Politicians from London